Qarab-e Sofla (also Romanized as Qārāb-e Soflá; also known as Fārāb-e Soflá, Kerov Ashagi, Nizhnyaya Kerov, and Qārāb Pā’īn) is a village in Kaghazkonan-e Shomali Rural District, Kaghazkonan District, Meyaneh County, East Azerbaijan Province, Iran. At the 2006 census, its population was 39, in 16 families.

References 

Populated places in Meyaneh County